William Douglas Rudge (born 15 July 1983 in Bristol) is an English cricketer. He was educated at Clifton College. He is a right-handed batsman and a right-arm medium-pace bowler who has played List A and first-class cricket for Gloucestershire. He had previously played for the Gloucestershire Cricket Board during 2002/03.
He is now playing Minor Counties cricket for Herefordshire, and made an impressive debut against Shropshire at Eastnor.

External links
Will Rudge at ECB

1983 births
English cricketers
Gloucestershire cricketers
Living people
Cricketers from Bristol
People educated at Clifton College
Gloucestershire Cricket Board cricketers
Herefordshire cricketers
Hertfordshire cricketers